Edin Terzić (born 30 October 1982) is a German-Croatian professional football coach and former player, who is currently the head coach of German Bundesliga club Borussia Dortmund.

Career

Early years
Terzić was born in 1982 in Menden, West Germany to a working-class family that immigrated from Yugoslavia. He is of paternal Bosniak and maternal Croatian descent and holds Croatian citizenship. Terzić played at the fourth level of professional leagues in Germany during his playing career. He is an alumnus of Ruhr University Bochum where he studied Sports Science.

Coaching career
Between 2010 and 2013, Terzić worked as a scout and assistant coach in the youth academy of Borussia Dortmund, reporting to then first team manager Jürgen Klopp. His older brother Alen also works as a scout for Borussia Dortmund and served as caretaker manager of Borussia Dortmund II during the 2019–20 Regionalliga West season.

Terzić was an assistant coach of Slaven Bilić at Beşiktaş between 2013 and 2015 and at West Ham United from 2015 to 2017. His collaboration with Bilić started in 2012, when Terzić drafted and delivered a pre-game opponent analysis for Croatia's group stage match against Republic of Ireland at Euro 2012. Satisfied with the analysis, Bilić offered him to join him as assistant coach at Lokomotiv Moscow, however, the deal eventually fell through. Bilić offered Terzić once again to join him at Beşiktaş and Terzić accepted the offer after consulting with Borussia Dortmund. He followed him to West Ham United in 2015, but left the club two years later when Bilić was sacked on 6 November 2017.

Since 2018, Terzić has held UEFA Pro Licence qualification, after graduating from an 18-month long course of The Football Association in England. Fellow graduates included future Chelsea manager Graham Potter as well as former professional players Nicky Butt and Nemanja Vidić.

Terzić returned to Borussia Dortmund in 2018 as an assistant coach of the first team after the appointment of Lucien Favre as coach. He took charge of the team along with his colleague Manfred Stefes for the 2018–19 encounter against TSG 1899 Hoffenheim, as head coach Favre missed the match due to illness. After Favre was sacked following a 5–1 loss against VfB Stuttgart in December 2020, Terzić was appointed interim manager until the end of the 2020–21 season. On 13 May 2021, Terzić won the 2020–21 DFB-Pokal with Borussia Dortmund. He was succeeded on a permanent basis by Borussia Mönchengladbach manager Marco Rose.

Instead of returning to his position as assistant manager for the 2021–22 season, Terzić moved to the newly created position as technical manager. After Borussia Dortmund and Rose mutually agreed to part ways after the season concluded, Terzić was reappointed manager on a permanent basis, signing a contract until 2025.

Managerial statistics

Honours

Manager
Borussia Dortmund
 DFB-Pokal: 2020–21

References

External links

Profile at the Borussia Dortmund website

1982 births
Living people
People from Menden (Sauerland)
Sportspeople from Arnsberg (region)
Footballers from North Rhine-Westphalia
German people of Bosnia and Herzegovina descent
German people of Croatian descent
Croatian people of Bosniak descent
Association football forwards
German footballers
Croatian footballers
SC Westfalia Herne players
SG Wattenscheid 09 players
BV Cloppenburg players
Oberliga (football) players
Regionalliga players
Landesliga players
German football managers
Croatian football managers
Borussia Dortmund managers
Bundesliga managers
Association football coaches
Beşiktaş J.K. non-playing staff
West Ham United F.C. non-playing staff
Borussia Dortmund non-playing staff
Association football scouts